Immaculate Conception High School (ICHS) is an American private, Roman Catholic, all-girls college-preparatory high school located in Lodi, in Bergen County, New Jersey, United States. The school operates under the jurisdiction of the Roman Catholic Archdiocese of Newark. The school was founded in 1915 by the Felician Sisters. ICHS has been accredited by the Middle States Association of Colleges and Schools Commission on Elementary and Secondary Schools since 1961.

As of the 2019–20 school year, the school had an enrollment of 145 students and 17.8 classroom teachers (on an FTE basis), for a student–teacher ratio of 8.1:1. The school's student body was 62.1% (90) White, 26.2% (38) Hispanic, 10.3% (15) Black and 1.4% (2) Asian. Average class size is 15 students. The administration, faculty and staff consist of three Felician Sisters, 19 women, and 8 men. About 98% of seniors pursue higher education.

History
Established in 1915, the school was granted approval by the state in November 1923 to operate as a secondary school. Constructed at a cost of $1 million (equivalent to $ million in ), Newark Diocese Archbishop Thomas Aloysius Boland officiated at ceremonies in September 1957 dedicating the new school, which had a student body of 500, including an incoming ninth grade class of nearly 150.

Athletics 
The Immaculate Conception High School Blue Wolves participate in the North Jersey Interscholastic Conference, which is comprised of small-enrollment schools in Bergen, Hudson County, Morris County and Passaic County counties, and was created following a reorganization of sports leagues in Northern New Jersey by the New Jersey State Interscholastic Athletic Association (NJSIAA). Prior to league realignment that took effect in the fall of 2010, Immaculate Conception was part of the smaller Bergen-Passaic Scholastic League (BPSL). With 320 students in grades 10-12, the school was classified by the NJSIAA for the 2019–20 school year as Non-Public B for most athletic competition purposes, which included schools with an enrollment of 37 to 366 students in that grade range (equivalent to Group I for public schools).

Sports offered include soccer, volleyball, tennis, cross country, basketball, softball, cheerleading, swimming and track.

Athletic accomplishments:
2004 Bowling Team: State Tournament Non-Public B sectionals
2005-06 Basketball Team: 2nd Place BPSL Carpenter, County Tournament, State Tournament Non-Public B semifinalist
2006 Softball Team: 2nd Place BPSL Carpenter, County Tournament, State Tournament Non-Public B semifinalist
2006-07 Basketball Team: 1st Place BPSL Carpenter, County Tournament, State Tournament Non-Public B finalist

Softball
The team won the Non-Public B state championship each year from 2013–2019. The seven consecutive titles are the longest streak in the state and the seven state titles are tied for fifth among all programs in New Jersey.

The softball team won its first state championship in 2013, defeating Sacred Heart High School by a score of 6–4 in the tournament final; Sacred Heart had defeated Immaculate Conception by a 3–1 score in the finals the previous season and was playing its final softball game before the school's closure at the end of the 2012–13 school year.

The team repeated as Non-Public B champion in 2014, with a 5–0 win against St. Joseph High School (Hammonton) in the final game of the tournament, finishing with a 27–2 record for the season.

The team won their third consecutive title in 2015 with a 2–1 win in a rematch against St. Joseph, coming from behind to win the tournament final by scoring one run in the bottom of the sixth inning and a walk-off run on a single with one out in the seventh, finishing the season with a 22–5 record.

In a game that marked Jeff Horohonich's 600th career victory as a coach, the team won its fourth title with a 3–0 win against Benedictine Academy in the 2016 final, to finish the season with a 20–9 record and become the third program to win four straight group titles.

In 2017, the softball team won the Non-Public B championship, defeating Wildwood Catholic High School by a score of 8–2 in the tournament final; the win was the program's fifth consecutive Non-Public B title, setting a state record for consecutive softball state group championships. The team advanced to the inaugural New Jersey State Interscholastic Athletic Association softball Tournament of Champions and made it to the final, where the team lost by a score of 7–6 in extra innings against Immaculate Heart Academy in the tournament final.

In 2018, after winning the program's sixth consecutive Non-Public B title with a 3-0 win against Wildwood Catholic, the team came into the state Tournament of Champions as the sixth and lowest seeded, and won the quarterfinals against third-seed North Hunterdon High School by a score 5-3 and second-seed Robbinsville High School in the semis by 12-2 before losing in the finals by a score of 9–0 to fourth-seed Steinert High School.

The team won its seventh straight Non-Public B state championship in 2019 with a 4-0 win against St. Joseph High School in the playoff finals.

Clubs 
Clubs offered include: Student Council, National Honor Society, Rho Kappa National Honor Society, National English Honor Society, Mu Alpha Theta Math Honor Society, Spanish Honor Society, Ambassadors, Art Club, Yearbook, Vocal Ensemble, Dance Club, Adoration Club, Spiritual Book Club, Book Club, Choir, Knitting and Crocheting Club, Music Appreciation Club, Literary Magazine, Fitness Club, Math League, Photography Club

Musical theatre 
ICHS performs a musical once a year in the spring.

Past Shows:
1992 - The Unsinkable Molly Brown
1993 - Cinderella
1994 - Bye Bye Birdie
1995 - The Music Man
1997 - Grease
1998 - West Side Story
1999 - Guys and Dolls
2000 - Anything Goes
2002 - Grease
2003 - Everything's Coming Up Broadway (Broadway Review)
2004 - Godspell
2005 - Once on This Island
2006 - Bye Bye Birdie
2007 - Grease
2008 - Annie
2009 - Footloose
2010 - Little Shop of Horrors
2011 - Seussical
2012 - 20 years of Drama and Music at Immaculate Conception High School" (Broadway Review)
2013 - West Side Story2014 - Into the Woods2015 - Anything Goes2016 - Beauty and the Beast2017 - The Little Mermaid2018 - 42nd Street2019 - Shrek The Musical2022 - High School Musical Fall Drama 
ICHS has recently revived its annual fall drama.

Past Shows:
1995- You Can't Take It With You1996- Steel Magnolias1997- Arsenic and Old Lace1998- Marvin's Room2011- Little Women2012- Murder Mystery2013- Anne of Green Gables2014- The Wizard of Oz2015- 12 Angry Jurors2016-  Aesop's (Oh So Slightly) Updated Fables 2017-  Murders in the Heir 2018-  A Seussified Christmas Carol 2019-  The Best Christmas Pageant Ever 2021-  Just in the Nick of Time 2022-  The Play That Goes Wrong  Notable alumni
 Rachel Zegler (born 2001, class of 2019), actress starring in Steven Spielberg's film adaptation of West Side Story''.

References

External links
Immaculate Conception High School website
Data for Immaculate Conception High School, National Center for Education Statistics

1915 establishments in New Jersey
Educational institutions established in 1915
Girls' schools in New Jersey
Lodi, New Jersey
Middle States Commission on Secondary Schools
Private high schools in Bergen County, New Jersey
Roman Catholic Archdiocese of Newark
Catholic secondary schools in New Jersey